The Club de Croqueurs de Chocolat (literally: "Chocolate Crunchers' Club") is an association of chocolate specialists. Founded in 1981, it publishes a gastronomic guide dedicated to chocolate every year, and awards prizes at the Salon du Chocolat in Paris.

Among the founders in 1981 were Claude Lebey, food critic, Nicolas de Rabaudy, journalist, Jean-Paul Aron, philosopher, and Philippe Court, director of a champagne house.

The Club meets every two months in Paris  for tastings and an annual dinner during which the menus are exclusively made up of chocolate (chocolate candies, bars, chocolate desserts).

References 

Chocolate
Food and drink appreciation
Food and drink in France
1981 establishments in France
Organizations based in Paris